Leo Koguan is an Indonesian-born Chinese American businessman, investor, and philanthropist. He is the chairman and co-founder of SHI International Corp and was the third-largest individual shareholder in Tesla, Inc.

Biography 
Leo was born in Indonesia in 1955 to Chinese parents. He then moved to the United States and graduated from Columbia University's School of International and Public Affairs and New York Law School.

Leo co-founded SHI International Corp., an enterprise software company headquartered in Somerset, New Jersey with his ex-wife Thai Lee. He also invested in luxury hotel development in Shanghai's Xintiandi district through his shares in Shui On Land.

Leo is known in Mainland China for his philanthropic activities to a number of top universities. In 2008, Leo donated $30 million to Shanghai Jiao Tong University, which renamed its law school after Leo. He also donated $28 million to Peking University, which named one of its law school buildings after Leo. He endowed scholarships at Peking University and was named an honorary trustee. He was a donor to Tsinghua University, which named the new Tsinghua University Law Library after Leo. He also made a $12.5 million donation to Fudan University, which named its law building after him.

Initially a retail investor, Leo picked up stock trading in 2019 and amassed a fortune through his position in Tesla. He is the company's third largest individual shareholder, behind Elon Musk and Larry Ellison.

Personal life 
In 1989, Leo Koguan married Thai Lee, who is now the President and CEO of SHI International. 
They divorced in 2002. 
Leo lives in Singapore. In October 2020, he paid S$62m for Singapore's largest penthouse, Guoco Tower’s Wallich Residence, from British inventor and billionaire entrepreneur Sir James Dyson.

As of March 2022, Leo has a net worth of $7.8 billion, according to Forbes.

References 

Living people
American people of Chinese descent
American technology company founders
American philanthropists
Chinese philanthropists
Indonesian people of Chinese descent
Tesla, Inc. people
New York Law School alumni
School of International and Public Affairs, Columbia University alumni
1955 births
20th-century American businesspeople
21st-century American businesspeople